High Town may refer to:

 High Town, Luton, Bedfordshire, England
 High Town, Hereford, Herefordshire, England
 Part of Bridgnorth, Shropshire, England
 High Town, South Hampton, New Hampshire, U.S.

See also
 Hightown (disambiguation)